The 1988 Singapore Open, also known as the Konica Cup - The Invitational Asian Badminton Championships, took place from 2 ~ 7 February 1988 at the Singapore Badminton Hall in Singapore. It was the second edition of this event. The total prize money on offer was US$31,000.

Venue
Singapore Badminton Hall

Final results

References 

Badminton Asia Championships
Singapore Open (badminton)
1988 in badminton
1988 in Singaporean sport